Julie Blanchette  (born January 9, 1977, in Montreal, Quebec) is an elite level Canadian ringette player who has also worked as a trainer and coach and served as the captain of several ringette teams including Team Canada. Blanchette plays for the Montreal Mission of the National Ringette League and has also been a member of the Canadian national ringette team as both player and coach. Blanchette was an assistant coach for the 2022 Team Canada Seniors who competed in the 2022 World Ringette Championships.

Sporting career 
Blanchette started playing ringette when she was 4 years old. Her brother played ice hockey and her parents looked for a team game for her, eventually signing her up with the local ringette club in Montreal. She played her sport at every amateur level in Montreal and represented Team Quebec in the Canadian Ringette Championships and the Canada Winter Games.

Blanchette played at the Canadian elite level of ringette in the National Ringette League beginning in 2003 for the Montreal Mission. In 2005, she played a season for the club Ringette Turku in the elite ringette league of Finland,  (now renamed, SM Ringette).

She was a member of the Canadian national ringette team several times, beginning as a player for the 2004 national ringette team of Canada where she competed in the 2004 World Ringette Championships in Stockholm.
She made Team Canada again playing for the 2007 Canadian national ringette team who competed in the 2007 World Ringette Championships in Ottawa. 

Her final appearance as a player for Team Canada took place in 2010 where she competed with the 2010 Canadian senior team in the 2010 World Ringette Championships in Tampere. In 2008, she played in the 2008 Ringette World Club Championships in Sault Ste-Marie.

Blanchette served as team captain of the Canadian national ringette team and was also the captain of the National Ringette League's Montreal Mission. She has also worked as a ringette trainer and coach. She was the trainer for the national Team Canada juniors (Under-19 years) during the World Junior Ringette Championships (U19) of 2009 in Prague. In September 2013, Blanchette was named an assistant-coach of the 2013 national ringette team of Canada who competed in the 2013 World Ringette Championships.

Statistics

Club

International level

Honors 
  Won gold nine times in the Quebec Provincial Ringette Championships: 1995, 1996, 1997, 1998, 1999, 2000, 2003, 2004, and 2005.
  Won gold in 8 Canadian Ringette Championships.
  Won silver in the 2000 Canadian Ringette Championships in Prince George, British Columbia.
 Selected to the All-Star ringette team of at the 2000 Canadian Ringette Championships.
  Won silver as a player for Team Canada in the 2004 World Ringette Championships.
  Won silver as a player for Team Canada in the 2007 World Ringette Championships.
  Won bronze as the coach of Team Quebec in the 2007 Canada Winter Games.
  Won silver as the assistant coach of the Canadian junior national ringette team,  U19 Team Canada East, at the 2009 World Junior Ringette Championships (U-19) in August of 2009 in Prague, Czech Republic.
  Won silver as a player for Team Canada in the 2010 World Ringette Championships.
Top scorer of the Montreal Mission club and the 2nd top scorer in the history of the National Ringette League in Canada.
Top Canadian scorer during the 2008 Ringette World Club Championship.
Top scoring champion for the 2010-11 season in the National Ringette League in Canada with individual stats of 61 goals and 80 assists (for a total of 141 points).
 Selected to the All-Star team during the 2005 Canadian Ringette Championships in Winnipeg.
 Elected an MVP Player for the 2005-06 season and 2008-09 season in the National Ringette League.

Gallery

References

Other websites 
   Profile of Julie Blanchette for Montreal Mission
 Profile of Julie Blanchette for Canadian National Team
  A ringette star for the West End, The Monitor, April 26, 2007.

1977 births
Living people
Ringette players
Sportspeople from Montreal
Canadian sportswomen